Michael Ward (born George William Everard Yoe Ward; 9 April 1909 – 8 November 1997) was an English character actor who appeared in nearly eighty films between 1947 and 1978.

Early life
Ward was born in Carnmenellis in Cornwall, to clergyman William George Henry Ward and his wife Annie (née Dingle). He originally trained and worked as a teacher but then retrained at the Central School of Speech and Drama, and won his first film role in 1947, playing Mr Trafford in Alexander Korda's An Ideal Husband.

Career
In between the years 1947 and 1960, Ward appeared in no fewer than 30 films, making him one of the UK's busiest and most recognisable character actors.

As well as five Carry On films, Ward also appeared in four Norman Wisdom films and six made by the Boulting brothers.

In the early 1960s television started to take over Ward's career, and until his retirement in 1978 he appeared in (amongst many others) The Jack Benny Programme, The Avengers, The Morecambe and Wise Show, Dixon of Dock Green, The Two Ronnies, Armchair Theatre, Rising Damp and Sykes.

After making what would be his last ever screen outing in 1978's Revenge of the Pink Panther, Ward suffered a stroke which forced him to retire. By 1986, he was unable to walk. He died on 8 November 1997 at St Mary's Hospital in London. He was 88. ward was an extremely complicated character and never really recovered from the death of his mother in the late 60s. He was also gay (openly from the late 1960s) which caused him a lot of problems. Ward was a very sensitive man and needed to be reassured regularly.

Selected films

 An Ideal Husband (1947) – Mr. Tommy Tafford
 Calling Paul Temple (1948) – Passer-by (uncredited)
 Saraband for Dead Lovers (1948) – (uncredited)
 Sleeping Car to Trieste (1948) – Elvin
 Once a Jolly Swagman (1949) – Artist at Chelsea Party (uncredited)
 The Queen of Spades (1949) – Officer in the Gaming Room (uncredited)
 Stop Press Girl (1949) – Hairdressers Manager (uncredited)
 Marry Me! (1949) – Minor Role (uncredited)
 Helter Skelter (1949) – News Reader (uncredited0
 Trottie True (1949) – Pianist at Ball (uncredited)
 High Jinks in Society (1949) – Watkins
 So Long at the Fair (1950) – Pilkington (uncredited)
 What the Butler Saw (1950) – Gerald
 Tony Draws a Horse (1950) – Photographer (uncredited)
 Trio (1950) – Undetermined Secondary Role (uncredited)
 No Trace (1950) – Wigmaker
 Seven Days to Noon (1950) – Cast Member (uncredited)
 Lilli Marlene (1951) – Wintertree
 Pool of London (1951) – Pianist (uncredited)
 The Galloping Major (1951) – Blimpish Character (uncredited)
 Life in Her Hands (1951) – Ralph (uncredited)
 Chelsea Story (1951) – Chris Fawcett
 Cheer the Brave (1951)
 Calling Bulldog Drummond (1951) – (uncredited)
 Appointment with Venus (1951) – Senior Clerk's Assistant
 Tom Brown's Schooldays (1951) – Master
 High Treason (1951) – Music Club Member (uncredited)
 Blind Man's Bluff (1952) – Jewellers Assistant
 Whispering Smith Hits London (1952) – Reception Clerk
 13 East Street (1952) – Barman
 The Happy Family (1952) – BBC Announcer
 Song of Paris (1952) – Waterson
 The Frightened Man (1952) – Cornelius Hart
 The Tall Headlines (1952) – Dentist
 Emergency Call (1952) – Roberto
 Tread Softly (1952) – Alexander Mayne
 Street Corner (1953) – Jewellery Salesman (uncredited)
 The Fake (1953) – Art Salesman
 Trouble in Store (1953) – Wilbur
 The Love Lottery (1954) – Hotel Receptionist
 Josephine and Men (1955) – Bohemian
 Man of the Moment (1955) – Photographer
 Lost (1956) – Mantilla (uncredited)
 Private's Progress (1956) – Sidney (uncredited)
 Jumping for Joy (1956) – Pertwee (uncredited)
 The Intimate Stranger (1956) – Costume Designer (uncredited)
 Up in the World (1956) – Maurice
 Brothers in Law (1957) – Photographer
 Just My Luck (1957) – Cranley
 Carlton-Browne of the F.O. (1959) – Hotel Manager (uncredited)
 The Ugly Duckling (1959) – Pasco
 I'm All Right Jack (1959) – Reporter
 The Rough and the Smooth (1959) – Headwaiter
 Follow a Star (1959) – Bit Role (uncredited)
 Doctor in Love (1960) – Dr. Flower
 Carry On Regardless (1961) – Photographer
 Mary Had a Little... (1961) – Hunter
 A Pair of Briefs (1962) – Judge's Dresser (uncredited)
 Carry On Cabby (1963) – Man in Tweeds
 Father Came Too! (1963) – Man at Auction
 Carry On Cleo (1964) – Archimedes
 The Big Job (1965) – Undertaker
 Carry On Screaming! (1966) – Mrt. Vivian
 Where the Bullets Fly (1966) – Michael
 Carry On Don't Lose Your Head (1966) – Henri
 Smashing Time (1967) – Elderly Shop Owner
 Frankenstein and the Monster from Hell (1974) – Transvest  
 Man About the House (1974) – Mr. Gideon
 Revenge of the Pink Panther (1978) – Real Estate Agent (final film role)

References

External links
Official Website

Biography on Avengers website

1909 births
1997 deaths
English male television actors
English male film actors
Alumni of the Royal Central School of Speech and Drama
Male actors from Cornwall
20th-century English male actors
English gay actors
20th-century English LGBT people